Philip Neville Arps is a New Zealand white supremacist best known for being jailed after publicly sharing the livestream of the 2019 Christchurch mosque shootings.

Before 2019
By March 2019 Arps had more than 30 criminal convictions for indecent assault, guns, drugs, burglary, and fraud. A 2019 news report referred to "an indecent assault on a woman in 1999". Another report described him as having been "previously made bankrupt in 2001".

His most prominent offending before 2019 occurred in 2016, when he pleaded guilty to charges of offensive behaviour after being part of a group that delivered pigs' heads and offal to a Al Noor Mosque in Christchurch. The mosque was collecting food donations to send to Fiji in the aftermath of Cyclone Winston and the animal remains were left in a box marked "Fiji". As part of the offending Arps and another man filmed themselves giving Nazi salutes and Arps saying, "White power ... Bring on the cull." He was fined $800 and said that he "won" by not being prosecuted for a hate crime.

Arps owns a "Nazi-themed insulation company" that openly operated in Christchurch. Beneficial Insulation used a black sun symbol (designed by Heinrich Himmler) as its logo on company vans, charged prices in multiples of $14.88, dressed staff in camouflage uniforms, and had a web address that alluded to Auschwitz concentration camp. In the wake of the terrorist attacks of March 2019 the company was reported to police, removed from review websites like Builderscrack, and delisted by the Insulation Association of New Zealand. Its website and Facebook profiles were both taken offline.  the company remains registered with Arps holding a 99% share.

Christchurch mosque shootings, 2019 

On 15 March 2019 there was a mass shooting in Christchurch targeting Muslims. The murderer carried a camera throughout, livestreaming to social media. The resulting video of the shooting was quickly classified by David Shanks of the Office of Film and Literature Classification as "objectionable" under the Films, Videos, and Publications Classification Act 1993, making it a criminal offense to possess or distribute it, and police took action against 13 people in relation to the video. Arps sent the video to 30 people, describing it as "awesome", and asked a friend to modify it by adding cross-hairs and a "kill count". When arrested he told police that he "could not give a fuck, mate" about the shooting victims.

He was found guilty of distributing objectionable material. At one of his court appearances, Arps distributed copies of the "Holocaust Handbooks" series by German holocaust denier Germar Rudolf to journalists and the public. In June 2019, Arps was sentenced to 21 months in jail, with Massey University distinguished professor Paul Spoonley describing him as "an unrepentant, hardcore white supremacist". At his sentencing Judge Stephen O'Driscoll described Arps as "remorseless". His pre-sentencing report included matters that gave the judge "real concern", including Arps comparing himself to Rudolf Hess, Deputy Führer of Nazi Germany. Arps filed the first of two unsuccessful appeals against his sentence on the day he received it.

While in prison, Arps sent a letter to Newshub which praised mass murderer Anders Breivik, threatened harm to Prime Minister Jacinda Ardern, and expressed a desire to see a former Prime Minister publicly executed. Newshub did not publish the letter. The Government announced plans to change the way letters written by extremist prisoners are vetted before sending.

His sentencing and unsuccessful appeals were later referenced by the Royal Commission of Inquiry into the terrorist attack as part of its paper on hate crime. Answering a question from the public the Commission of Inquiry also reported "no evidence [the shooter] knows Philip Arps or that there was any other connection between them."

"White supremacist" complaint
Arps was called a "white supremacist" in a television piece filmed by Newshub journalist Patrick Gower and broadcast on 30 June 2019. He submitted a complaint to the Broadcasting Standards Authority on the grounds that this label was "inaccurate and unbalanced". The BSA found that "we do not consider the issue of whether Mr Arps is a ‘white supremacist’ to be a controversial issue" and that Gower's words were "clearly a statement of analysis and opinion". Arps's complaint was not upheld.

Media reports have regularly described Arps as a white supremacist since the ruling. Newshub's reports on a court appearance in December 2020, a 2022 New Zealand Herald column by sociologist Dr Jarrod Gilbert, and Stuff's reporting into Arps's run for a high school board of trustees all used the term directly or indirectly.

Aftermath – bail and subsequent charges
Arps was released on bail in January 2020. Conditions of this release included wearing a GPS monitor, making no contact with members of the Muslim community, and a ban on owning or using firearms. In August 2020 he was arrested and appeared in court after visiting a home brew store next door to Linwood Mosque. Charges were dropped, but in December he returned to court and a new condition was added to his release, preventing him from coming within 100m of the Linwood Islamic Centre. New bail-related charges were filed against Arps on January 8, 2021. He was arrested again in March 2021, accused of sending obscene messages to a probation officer. Police opposed bail, but it was granted.

In February 2023 Arps was found guilty of breaching his release conditions by sending abusive and obscene messages to parole officers in 2020 and 2021, and by not charging his GPS tracker. The verdict was delivered almost a year after his trial on 18 February 2022, when Arps appeared in the Christchurch District Court having refused to wear a mask or take a rapid COVID test, and saying he was unvaccinated. A New Zealand flag was draped over his shoulder during his appearance. (He had been in court five days earlier on a separate matter relating to the Convoy 2022 New Zealand protest – see "Public execution" arrest, 2022 below.) Sentencing is scheduled for later in 2023.

In August 2022 Arps protested in support of Counterspin Media founders Kelvyn Alp and Hannah Spierer as they appeared in Christchurch District Court. Like Arps had been, they were charged with distributing an objectionable publication – specifically, the livestream video of the Christchurch shootings. Arps shouted insults at counterprotestors and at people entering the court.

Anti-Government protests after 2019

"Public execution" arrest, 2022
Arps was arrested in Picton on 11 February 2022 while travelling north to join the Convoy 2022 New Zealand protest in Wellington. According to media reports he had told people at a Christchurch petrol station that was on his way to a "public execution", and that  “I’ve been promising it, I’ll see you in seven to 10 years”. He also reportedly threatened to kill members of the public and police.

He was charged with threatening to kill and using offensive language. Three days later, on Monday 14, he was granted bail with conditions including a ban on entering the greater Wellington area. As the protest continued Arps was an active participant on Telegram, calling for contractors who helped police install concrete blocks to be named and added to the "Nuremberg list".

Te Aratai College
In June 2022 Christchurch's Te Aratai College, formerly Linwood College, was officially opened by Prime Minister Jacinda Ardern. At least one of Arps' sons was a student there at the time. A "freedom movement" protest of 50–100 people gathered near the school during the Prime Minister's visit, having been encouraged by Arps and others. His social media posts, made under the username "Antisemite", claimed that his son had attracted the attention of security by asking whether Ardern would be protected by bulletproof glass. The protesters' grievances included vaccines, Marxism, the media, police, and Three Waters. Ardern was kept away from the protest.

Four months later, in September 2022, Arps finished last in the election for parent representatives on Te Aratai College's Board of Trustees. He received 25 votes (the school roll was 870). His candidacy had been controversial, with Federation of Islamic Associations of New Zealand chair Abdur Razzaq describing Arps' nomination as part of a trend where white supremacists take part in elections to "create disharmony" and "normalise hate". Students, including the head student, and a Christchurch city councillor with children at the school publicly lobbied against Arps.

Routine police vetting, which would have excluded Arps from most positions within a school, did not apply to board members at the time. Before the election was over Associate Education Minister Jan Tinetti sought urgent advice on an incoming code of conduct for school boards, and whether it could affect someone's eligibility for a board position. She also asked about her legal ability to intervene if Arps was elected.

Personal life
Arps lives in Christchurch and describes himself as a "father of six boys".

Additional reading
 ARPS AND MEDIAWORKS TV LTD – 2019-073B (7 MAY 2020)

CA469/2019 – Arps v New Zealand Police [2019 NZCA 592] 

BENEFICIAL INSULATION INSTALLS GUARANTEED LIMITED (2442734) Registered
Addressing Hate Crime in New Zealand: A Separate Offence? (login required)
Hate speech and hate crime related legislation

Court judgements
 R v Arps (2019), NZDC 11547
Arps v New Zealand Police (2019), CRI-2019-409-000079  NZHC 2113
Press Release (NZ Court of Appeal): Arps v New Zealand Police (28 November 2019)
Arps v Department of Corrections (2020), CRI-2020-409-000011 NZHC 706

References

1970s births
Living people
Neo-Nazism in New Zealand
People from Christchurch
New Zealand businesspeople
New Zealand criminals
Holocaust deniers
Year of birth missing (living people)